Tranel is a given name and surname. 

Notable people with the given name include:
Tranel Hawkins (born 1962), American hurdler 

Notable people with the surname include:
Daniel Tranel (born 1957), American professor of neurology 
Monica Tranel (born 1966), American rower and lawyer
Travis Tranel (born 1985), American politician

See also
Mestranol